"Maailma on tehty meitä varten" is a song recorded by Finnish pop rock band Haloo Helsinki! for their fourth studio album Maailma on tehty meitä varten (2013). The song was released by Ratas Music Group as a promotional single for airplay on 23 May 2013 and has peaked at number 14 on the Finnish Singles Chart and number two on the Official Download Chart.

Charts

References

2013 songs
Haloo Helsinki! songs
Finnish-language songs